Ethmia lecmima is a moth in the family Depressariidae. It is found in Afghanistan, Iran, Pakistan and the United Arab Emirates.

Subspecies
Ethmia lecmima lecmima
Ethmia lecmima amsel Kemal & Kocak, 2005

References

Moths described in 1967
lecmima